The Ford Motor Company Assembly Plant is a building located at 4735 E. Marginal Way South in Seattle, Washington. Designed by Albert Kahn, it was added to the National Register of Historic Places on October 9, 2013. It is now part of the Federal Center South complex and is owned by the General Services Administration.

See also
 National Register of Historic Places listings in Seattle, Washington

References

National Register of Historic Places in Seattle
Government buildings in Seattle